Citizens' Forum is a Canadian current affairs television program which aired on CBC Television from 1955 to 1962.

Premise
Episodes in the first season of Citizens' Forum concerned social topics such as the prison system, whether Canada could be considered a Christian nation, unemployment and various current news stories. A panel conversation was followed by discussion from a studio audience. A subject could be presented for three weeks, followed by feedback from viewers in a follow-up "What People Say" episode.

In the second season (1956–1957), the program aired on Sunday afternoons instead of prime time and the episodes no longer adhered to a strict panel and audience format. The initial four episodes of that season featured debates on a particular resolution in each episode. Another set of episodes, named "You Be The Critic", allowed viewers to mail in their views on particular topics. "Take It From Here" was another set of programs which presented a subject as a short drama followed by a discussion. During the program's run, it used telephone call-in segments and sometimes originated in different Canadian cities.

Citizens' Forum was a co-production between the CBC and the Canadian Association for Adult Education (CAAE), adapted from a similar program which was broadcast on CBC Radio since 1943. After this program ended in April 1962, the next CBC/CAAE co-production was The Sixties (1963–1966).

Les idées en marche on Radio-Canada was a more successful French-language version of Citizens' Forum. Like the English program, it was also a co-production with an educational body.

Broadcast
This half-hour program was broadcast as follows (times in North American Eastern):

References

External links
 

CBC Television original programming
1955 Canadian television series debuts
1962 Canadian television series endings